Table of Six is a political conference established by the Republican People's Party, Good Party, Felicity Party, Democrat Party, Democracy and Progress Party and Future Party, with the first meeting held on 12 February 2022. Uğur Poyraz, Secretary General of the Good Party, announced that the Nation Alliance was an alliance in the election process and became a cooperation after the election process was left behind.

The Table of Six was originally an independent entity from the Nation Alliance. On 21 January 2023, Table of Six defined itself as the "Nation Alliance" for the first time after its 11th meeting. The Nation Alliance shared the Common Policies Memorandum of Understanding with the public in Ankara on 30 January 2023.

On 3 March 2023, Good Party leader Meral Akşener announced that she took the decision to withdraw from the Table of Six and said her party would not support main opposition Republican People's Party leader Kemal Kılıçdaroğlu as the joint candidate in the 2023 Turkish presidential election. However on 6 March, she and her party rejoined the Table of Six after intense public criticism and after it was announced that Ekrem İmamoğlu and Mansur Yavaş would be appointed Vice-Presidents if Kılıçdaroğlu wins the presidential election.

Strengthened parliamentary system 

The six-table members of the political parties signed a memorandum of understanding by issuing a declaration for the transition to the strengthened parliamentary system on 28 February 2022.

In the text of the memorandum, lowering the electoral threshold to 3%, treasury aid to the parties that received at least 1% of the votes, ending the bag law practice, removing the veto power of the president and extending his term of office to 7 years, recognising the authority to issue a no-confidence question on the government, human rights and human rights in the education curriculum. There were promises such as the addition of gender equality courses.

Members and political affiliations

References

External links

2022 establishments in Turkey
Political movements in Turkey
Political parties established in 2022
Political party alliances in Turkey